Ann Goldstein (1957) is an American curator currently serving as deputy director and chair of modern and contemporary art at the Art Institute of Chicago. Goldstein formerly served as a curator  at the Museum of Contemporary Art, Los Angeles, and as museum director of the Stedelijk Museum Amsterdam.

Life and work
Goldstein was born in 1957 in Los Angeles, California, United States. She studied at the University of California, Los Angeles, where she got her Bachelor of Fine Arts in studio art.

Goldstein worked at the Museum of Contemporary Art in Los Angeles from 1983 to 2009. She was the senior curator from 2001 onwards. Her expertise was minimal and conceptual art of the 1960–70s and current practices.

From 2010 until 2012, she was the museum director of the Stedelijk Museum Amsterdam, a museum of modern art, contemporary art, and design in Amsterdam, Netherlands. Her first two and a half years at the Stedelijk, the museum was closed for renovation (since 2003), until it reopened for the general public in September 2012. In 2013, she was the artistic director of the museum alongside Karin van Gilst as managing director, until Goldstein resigned and left the museum on 1 December 2013.

In March 2016, Goldstein was selected as the deputy director, chair, and curator of modern and contemporary art at the Art Institute of Chicago.

References

1957 births
American art curators
Living people
Directors of museums in the United States
Women museum directors
People from Los Angeles
UCLA School of the Arts and Architecture alumni
American expatriates in the Netherlands
Directors of museums in Amsterdam
American women curators